A waiver is the voluntary relinquishment or surrender of some known right or privilege.

Regulatory agencies of state departments or the federal government may issue waivers to exempt companies from certain regulations. For example, a United States law restricted the size of banks, but when banks exceeded these sizes, they obtained waivers. In another example, the United States federal government may issue waivers to individual states so that they may provide Medicaid in different ways than the law typically requires.

While a waiver is often in writing, sometimes a person's words can also be used as a counteract to a waiver. An example of a written waiver is a disclaimer, which becomes a waiver when accepted. When the right to hold a person liable through a lawsuit is waived, the waiver may be called an exculpatory clause, liability waiver, legal release, or hold harmless clause.

In some cases, parties may sign a "non-waiver" contract which specifies that no rights are waived, particularly if a person's actions may suggest that rights are being waived. This is particularly common in insurance.
Sometimes the elements of "voluntary" and "known" are established by a legal fiction. In this case, one is presumed to know one's rights and that those rights are voluntarily relinquished if not asserted at the time.

In civil procedure, certain arguments must be raised in the first objection that a party submits to the court, or else they will be deemed waived.

Enforceability
The following represent a general overview of considerations; specifics may vary dramatically depending on the jurisdiction.

Key factors that some courts (depending on jurisdiction) may look at while determining the applicability of a waiver:
 In some jurisdictions, one may not prospectively waive liability for some or all intentional activities
 Waivers generally must be made voluntarily and with the full knowledge (or the ability to know) of the right being waived
 The waiver should be unambiguous and clear to a reasonable person
 In some jurisdictions (not including the United States), it may be necessary that the parties to the waiver have equal bargaining power
 A waiver may have limited application where one contracts for an "essential service" such that it may violate public policy for liability to be waived
 A waiver that the courts will not enforce because the purpose of the agreement is to achieve an illegal end constitutes an illegal agreement.

Examples

Personal jurisdiction
In the case of Insurance Corp. of Ireland v. Compagnie des Bauxites de Guinee, 456 U.S. 694 (1982) the United States Supreme Court decided that when a court orders a party to produce proof on a certain point, and that party refuses to comply with the court's order, the court may deem that refusal to be a waiver of the right to contest that point and assume that the proof would show whatever the opposing party claims that it would.

In that court case, the defendant had argued that the court lacked personal jurisdiction over it but refused a court order to produce evidence of this lack of jurisdiction. The defendant argued that, because the court lacked jurisdiction, the court had no authority to issue an order to show proof of the lack of jurisdiction.  The Supreme Court rejected that argument and determined that the defendant's refusal to comply waived the right to contest jurisdiction, just as if it had never contested jurisdiction at all.

Illegal waiver or agreement
In US states such as California, a waiver is not lawful when it is contrary to an express provision of law, its implicit policy, or good morals. Furthermore, one cannot waive responsibility for violation of law, willful injury to a person or property of another, for fraud, or waive their residential tenant rights.

See also
 Disclaimer
 Due process
 Estoppel
 Illegal agreement
 Loan waiver
 Tort reform
 Waiver and forfeiture

References

Contract law
Civil procedure
Equitable defenses
Copyright law